Leinweber is a German surname.

Notable people with this surname include:

Chris Leinweber (born 1981), Canadian ice hockey defenceman
David Leinweber, head of the Lawrence Berkeley National Laboratory Computational Research Division's Center for Innovative Financial Technology
Harry Leinweber (1907–1992), insurance underwriter and a municipal and provincial level politician
Judi Leinweber (born 1950), Canadian alpine skier who competed in the 1968 Winter Olympics References
Walter Leinweber (1907–1997), German ice hockey player who competed in the 1932 Winter Olympics

External links
Leinweber at Surnamedb.com